Edwin Richards (born 15 June 1957) is a New Zealand sprint canoer who competed in the mid-1980s. At the 1984 Summer Olympics in Los Angeles, he was eliminated in the semifinals of the K-2 1000 m event.

External links

1957 births
Canoeists at the 1984 Summer Olympics
New Zealand male canoeists
Living people
Olympic canoeists of New Zealand
Place of birth missing (living people)
20th-century New Zealand people